The Caspian lowland desert ecoregion (WWF ID: PA1308) covers the north and southeast coasts of the Caspian Sea, including the deltas of the Volga River and Ural River in the northern region. While the region gets relatively low amounts of precipitation (less than 200 mm/year), wildlife is supported by the river estuaries and the sea itself. The wetlands are an internationally important area for bird nesting and migratory resting. The ecoregion is in the Palearctic realm, and the deserts and xeric shrublands biome.

Location and description 

The northern section is almost 900 km wide, and stretches up to 300 km inland across Russia and Kazakhstan. The sector along the southeast coast of the Caspian is mostly in Turkmenistan. Elevations throughout the ecoregion range between -28 and +100 meters. The dry areas were once underwater, but as the sea has slowly receded the dry areas have revealed a landscape of sand dunes, ridges, salt domes, salt pans ('shors'), and clay deserts ('takyrs').

Climate 
The climate of the ecoregion is represented by that in the Volga delta, in the Astrakhan Nature Reserve, where the climate is cool semi-arid (Köppen climate classification BSk). This climate is characterized by high variation in temperature, both daily and seasonally; with low precipitation. Average annual precipitation in the Caspian lowlands is 198 mm.

Flora and fauna 
Both dry steppe and coastal wetland floral communities are supported in this ecoregion.  The vegetation on the southeast coast in Turkmenistan is relatively sparse, but notable for hosting specialized shrub and semi-shrub halophytes ('salt-loving plants').  Examples include sagebrushes (Artemisia) and tetyr (Salsola gemmascens). The latter is a shrub that reaches  in height.

The Caspian coast is an internationally significant nesting and migratory area for gulls, terns, and other waterfowl in the Asia-Europe migration paths.  The birds that cross the area twice a year number in the tens of millions.  Over 200,000 of the Eurasian Coot (Fulica atra) winter in the southern Hazar Reserve.

Protections 
A 2017 assessment found that 3,838 km², or 1%, of the ecoregion is in protected areas. 38% of the ecoregion's area is relatively intact habitat.
There are several significant nationally protected area that reach into this ecoregion:

 Astrakhan Nature Reserve, protecting three sections of the islands and marshes of the Volga River delta
 Chyornye Zemli Nature Reserve, protecting natural steppe and semi-desert ecosystems of the 'black earth' region of the Caspian lowlands
 Hazar State Nature Reserve, an ornithological reserve on the southeast coast of the Caspian Sea, in Turkmenistan.
 Alagol, Almagol and Ajigol wetlands, a reserve for many waterfowl in Golestan province, North East of Iran.

References 

Deserts and xeric shrublands
Ecoregions of Iran
Ecoregions of Kazakhstan
Ecoregions of Russia
Ecoregions of Turkmenistan
Palearctic ecoregions